ATDC may refer to:
 Advanced Technology Development Center is a science and business incubator in Georgia.
 Advanced Technology Development Complex, part of Michigan Technological University
 Assam Tourism Development Corporation, is a state owned public sector undertaking in India.
 after top dead centre, in ignition timing of internal combustion engines
  the ataxia-telangiectasia group D complementing gene